The Centre pénitentiaire de Rennes is a women's prison of the French Prison Service in Rennes, Brittany, France. Since 2008, it has been the only women's prison in France. Its operations began in 1878. It was designed by the architect, Alfred-Nicolas Normand.
The prison also inspired the name of the character “Rennes”, from the 1997 Canadian horror film Cube.

References

External links

 Rennes CPF - French Prison Service

Centre penitentiaire
Prisons in France
Women's prisons in France
1878 establishments in France
Buildings and structures in Rennes
19th-century architecture in France